The Arimao Formation is a geologic formation in Cuba. It preserves mainly ammonite and rudist fossils dating back to the Santonian period.

See also 
 List of fossiliferous stratigraphic units in Cuba

References

Further reading 
 
 R. Rojas, M. Iturralde-Vinent, and P. W. Skelton. 1995. Stratigraphy, composition and age of Cuban rudist-bearing deposits. Revista Mexicana de Ciencias Geológicas 12(2):272-291

Geologic formations of Cuba
Cretaceous Cuba
Santonian Stage
Limestone formations
Shallow marine deposits
Formations